Gwenn Foulon (born 20 October 1998) is a French professional footballer who plays as a forward.

Club career
Foulon joined Valenciennes in 2015. He made his professional debut for the club in a 4–0 Ligue 2 win over Orléans on 21 April 2017. In June 2017, he signed his first professional contract with the club.

In January 2018, Foulon joined IC Croix on loan for the remainder of the 2017–18 season. In July 2018, Foulon was loaned again, this time to Bastia-Borgo for the 2018–19 season. Bastia-Borgo won promotion to the Championnat National, and Foulon joined the club for a second season. At the end of the 2019–20 season, Foulon terminated his contract with Valenciennes, and signed for Saint-Malo in Championnat National 2. In June 2021, he signed for Béziers. He left the club in January 2022.

International career
Foulon is a former youth international for France.

References

External links
 
 
 
 Valenciennes Profile

1998 births
Living people
Sportspeople from Quimper
Footballers from Brittany
Association football forwards
French footballers
France youth international footballers
Valenciennes FC players
Iris Club de Croix players
FC Bastia-Borgo players
US Saint-Malo players
AS Béziers (2007) players
Ligue 2 players
Championnat National players
Championnat National 2 players
Championnat National 3 players